See How They Run is an Australian-British children's television series co-produced by and aired on the BBC and ABC in 1999.  Based on the children's novel of the same name by David McRobbie, it is centred on the Cassidy family, who are placed in a Witness Protection programme in Sydney, Australia after the father agreed to give evidence in a trial against some gangsters who are seeking revenge. Filmed around the Blue Mountains of New South Wales, the series is narrated by the eldest daughter, Emma.

Cast
 Peter O'Brien as Don Cassidy 
 Anne Looby as Lily Cassidy
 Katie Blake as Emma Cassidy
 Becky Simpson	as Nicola Cassidy
 Vaughan Sevelle as Sam Foster
 Shelley King as Nina Pagetter
 Adam Ray as Roy
 Tessa Wells as Sharon Hargreaves
 Christopher Scoular as Graham Foster
 Julia Haworth as Christine
 Tessa Leahy as Miss Weston
 Brendan Donaghue as Greg
 Al Hunter Ashton as Inspector Greyson
 Lucy Maria Hopkins as WDC Arnott

Awards
1999 Australian Film Institute Awards
 Winner: Best Children's Television Drama (Writer Tim O'Mara)
 Nominee: Best Direction in a Television Drama (Graeme Harper for episode 1)
1999 Australian Screen Music Awards
 Winner: Best Original Music in a Children's TV or Animation Series (Mario Millo)

References

External links
 

Australian children's television series
1990s British children's television series
Australian Broadcasting Corporation original programming
Australian television shows based on children's books
British television shows based on children's books
1999 Australian television series debuts
1999 Australian television series endings
1999 British television series debuts
1999 British television series endings
Television shows set in England
Television shows set in Sydney
BBC children's television shows
CBBC shows
Television series about witness protection